Jean-Honoré Salavy (1749–1823) was a French businessman and politician.

Biography

Early life
Jean-Honoré Salavy was born on September 16, 1749, in Montpellier.

Career
He worked as a businessman in Marseille. He later worked with the firms "Solier, Salavy, Martin et Cie" and later with Salavy, Martin et Cie", alongside his father-in-law. He was a member of the Chamber of Commerce of Marseille.

He served on the city council of Marseille and the general council of Bouches-du-Rhône. He served as a member of the National Assembly from May 17, 1815, to July 13, 1815, during the Hundred Days.

Personal life
He was married to Julie Martin. They resided at 21 rue de l'Armeny in Marseille. They had three sons: 
Pierre-François-Antoine Salavy.
Joseph-Henri Salavy.
Jacques-Henri Salavy. They had a daughter:
Anne Salavy. She married composer Emmanuel de Fonscolombe (1810–1875).

He died on May 5, 1823, in Montpellier.

References

1749 births
1823 deaths
Businesspeople from Marseille
Politicians from Marseille
Members of the Chamber of Representatives (France)